Jouko Yrjö Nikkanen (31 December 1914 – 18 November 1985) was a Finnish javelin thrower, who won a silver medal at the 1936 Summer Olympics. His best throw of 70.77 meters was only one meter behind that of the gold medalist Gerhard Stöck, and just five centimeters ahead that of Kalervo Toivonen.

On 25 August 1938, Nikkanen set a world record at 77.87 meters; less than two months later, on 16 October 1938, he had improved his record to 78.70 m. Nikkanen's record was bettered only on 8 August 1953 by Bud Held.

References

1914 births
1985 deaths
People from Vyborg District
People from Viipuri Province (Grand Duchy of Finland)
Athletes (track and field) at the 1936 Summer Olympics
Finnish male javelin throwers
Olympic athletes of Finland
Olympic silver medalists for Finland
European Athletics Championships medalists
Medalists at the 1936 Summer Olympics
Olympic silver medalists in athletics (track and field)
Finnish military personnel of World War II
20th-century Finnish people